The Windshaft is a part in a windmill that carries the sails and also the brake wheel (Smock and Tower mills, and in some Post mills) or the head wheel and tail wheel in a Post Mill. Windshafts can be wholly made of wood, or wood with a cast iron poll end (upon where the sails are mounted) or entirely of cast iron.

References 

Architectural elements